Alan Francis Woolfall (born 30 November 1956) is an English former footballer who played as a forward. He scored fourteen goals in 75 league games in a seven-year career in the Football League. He turned out for Bury and Port Vale, as well as non-league sides Skelmersdale United and Marine.

Career
Woolfall played for Skelmersdale United before joining Bury, who finished 14th in the Third Division in 1974–75 under the stewardship of Bobby Smith. The "Shakers" finished 13th in 1975–76, before missing out on the promotion places by four places and five points in 1976–77. After Bob Stokoe took charge at Gigg Lane, Bury dropped to 15th in 1977–78 and 19th in 1978–79.

He joined Port Vale in August 1979. He scored on both his league and League Cup débuts, but failed to gain a regular spot in a team struggling near the bottom of the Fourth Division. In all he made seven league and three cup appearances in 1979–80, and scored three goals (at Walsall, Northampton Town, and Tranmere Rovers). Manager John McGrath used him eleven times in 1980–81, and Woolfall found the net once against Halifax Town. In all he made 21 appearances and scored four goals (all away from Vale Park) during a two-season spell, before he was given a free transfer to Northern Premier League side Marine in May 1981.

Career statistics
Source:

References

1956 births
Living people
Footballers from Liverpool
English footballers
Association football forwards
Skelmersdale United F.C. players
Bury F.C. players
Port Vale F.C. players
Marine F.C. players
English Football League players
Northern Premier League players